Chester Greyhound Stadium was a greyhound racing stadium on Sealand Road, west Chester, Cheshire. It is not to be confused with Sealand Road football stadium.

Origins and opening
The stadium was constructed on the north side of Sealand Road almost next door to the football stadium found on its east side.

History
The stadium was trading in January 1939, initially racing every Monday at 7.45pm with a totalisator available, and then every Saturday as well. It closed temporarily from September 1939 until reopening on 14 October 1939 and regularly raced throughout wartime. In 1946 the track was under the control of the Chester Greyhound Racing Association Ltd.
 
Racing was held on Monday and Saturday nights with the track circumference being 440 yards. Race distances were 530 and 755 yards and races consisted of mainly five dogs and using an 'Inside Sumner' hare system. The racing was independent (unaffiliated to a governing body).

Closure
The site closed on 10 January 1987  and was later demolished to make way for a large retail park. The nearby park and retail park are now called Greyhound Park and Greyhound Retail Park.

References

Defunct greyhound racing venues in the United Kingdom
Sport in Chester
Buildings and structures in Chester